Earl Smith is an American sociologist, currently the Rubin Distinguished Professor Emeritus of American Ethnic Studies at Wake Forest University, and formerly the Arthur A. Sio Distinguished Professor of Community and Diversity at Colgate University.
He teaches at George Mason University.

Life
He graduated from University of Connecticut. He taught at Pacific Lutheran University.

Works
 Race, Sport and the American Dream, Carolina Academic Press, 2006. , 
Policing the Black Body, 2018.

References

Year of birth missing (living people)
Living people
Wake Forest University faculty
American sociologists
Washington State University faculty
University of Connecticut alumni